The Luxembourg men's national water polo team is the representative for Luxembourg in international men's water polo.

Results

Olympic Games
1928 — 11th place

2019 EU Nations Water Polo Cup – Men Tournament (Brno) 

Luxembourg – Switzerland – 1:20 (0:8 / 0:4 / 0:3 / 1:5) – LUX Goals: Rondeau J. (1)
Luxembourg – USA – 2:28 (1:9 / 0:6 / 0:8 / 1:8) – LUX Goals: Soriot N. (1), Jacquet E. (1)
Lithuania – Luxembourg – 22:6 (2:1 / 6:3 / 4:2 / 10:0) – LUX Goals: Clemencin S. (2), Rondeau J. (2), Ricci P. (1), Jacquet E. (1)
Austria – Luxembourg – 25:4 (12:3 / 6:0 / 3:0 / 4:1) – LUX Goals: Clemencin S (2), Rondeau J. (1), Jacquet E. (1)
England – Luxembourg – 23:5 (9:1 / 4:1 / 6:1 / 4:2) – LUX Goals: Kalan G. (3), Charlé E. (1), Rondeau J. (1)
Singapore – Luxembourg – 24:4 (5:1 / 4:1 / 9:2 / 6:0) – LUX Goals: Clemencin S. (2), Kalan G. (2)
Wales – Luxembourg – 19:9 (3:4 / 2:1 / 7:4 / 7:0) – LUX Goals: Kalan G. (6), Charlé E. (2), Rondeau J. (1)

Team

Current squad
Roster for the 2019 EU Nations Water Polo Cup – Men Tournament (Brno).

Head coach: Bernard Pollak  Luxembourg men's national water polo team

References

Water polo
Men's national water polo teams
National water polo teams in Europe
National water polo teams by country
 
Men's sport in Luxembourg